Beechboro is a suburb of Perth, Western Australia, located within the City of Swan.

History

The name Beechboro reflects the history of the first European owner of land in the area.  In 1892 Henry Brockman subdivided land in the area.  The Brockman Family were well established landowners in the Swan River Colony and had considerable estates in England.  Beechboro Park (Kent, England) was the name of one of these estates and he named his new subdivisions after it.

Subdivisions – development and features
Beechboro has developed in a number of stages:

 East Beechboro – the trapezoidal area east of Altone Road through to Lord Street, bounded by Reid Highway to the north and Benara Road to the south. Housing dates from 1979 through to the late 1980s. Block sizes are typically 600-800m2.  Construction is usually brick and tile three bedroom one bathroom detached homes; with a few duplexes.
 West Beechboro – the square-shaped area west of Altone Road through to Beechboro Road North, again bounded by Reid Highway to the north and Benara Road to the south. Housing in West Beechboro dates from mid to late 1980s. Block sizes are typically 600-800m2. Construction is predominantly brick and tile; and the houses while still a majority of 3x1's, have increased in size and include a small number of 4x1's and some 4x2's.
 Timberlane Estate – a chunk of houses to the western extreme of Beechboro, defined by the boundaries of Reid Highway, Beechboro Road North and a dotted line on the southern edge running along the backyards of Blackboy Way.
Bennett Springs and Orchid Park were neighbourhoods of Beechboro until they became part of a new suburb of Bennett Springs in April 2011.

Schools
Beechboro Primary School
West Beechboro Primary School
East Beechboro Primary School
John Septimus Roe Anglican Community School

References

Suburbs of Perth, Western Australia
Suburbs and localities in the City of Swan